Skelley Adu Tutu (born August 10, 1979, in Kumasi) is a Ghanaian football striker.

International career
Adu Tutu represented the Ghana national under-20 football team in the 1999 FIFA World Youth Championship.

External links
Skelly Finds New Home In Lower Division

Player Profile : Skelley Adu Tutu

1979 births
Living people
Ghanaian footballers
Expatriate footballers in Italy
LASK players
Ghana international footballers
Ghana under-20 international footballers
Grazer AK players
Expatriate footballers in Austria
Saba players
Hapoel Be'er Sheva F.C. players
Israeli Premier League players
Liga Leumit players
Expatriate footballers in Iran
Ghanaian expatriate sportspeople in Belgium
Ghanaian expatriate sportspeople in Austria
Ghanaian expatriate sportspeople in Iran
Ghanaian expatriate sportspeople in Israel
Expatriate footballers in Belgium
King Faisal Babes FC players
Sekondi Hasaacas F.C. players
Kapfenberger SV players
Footballers from Kumasi
Association football forwards